

Autonomous islands
The constitution gives Grande Comore, Anjouan and Mohéli the right to govern most of their own affairs with their own presidents, except the activities assigned to the Union of the Comoros like Foreign Policy, Defense, Nationality, Banking and others.

 
Comoros
Comoros